Sir Thomas Grantham (bap. 1641 – 1718) was an English tobacco trader and naval officer, commander of the naval fleet of the British East India Company.

In 1684 he was sent to Bombay by the King of England to put down an insurrection led by the Company, who had set up a parallel government and assumed wide authority on the British people. After he landed in November 1684, he assumed control over the situation from Commander Keigwin and thus ending the standoff.

Grantham was also responsible for the strengthening of the walls of the Mahim Fort against attacks by the Portuguese who occupied the northern island of Salsette.

In 1676 Sir Thomas embarked for Virginia at the behest of then Governor Berkeley. He was made Admiral and knighted by King Charles II. Upon his arrival, he was sent up the James River to put an end to what has become known as "Bacon's Rebellion". By the time Sir Thomas encountered the rebels, their leader had died, and Sir Thomas quickly talked them into surrender on good terms. Unfortunately, promises of lenient treatment were not honored by Governor Berkeley who had most of the men hanged. Grantham died in London.

Works
An Historical Account of Some Memorable Actions, Particularly in Virginia; Also Against the Admiral of Algier, and in the East Indies: Perform'd for the Service of his Prince and Country, By Sir Thomas Grantham, Kt, J Roberts, London MDCCXVI; Reprinted by Carlton McCarthy & Co., at the behest of the State of Virginia, with an introduction by R.A. Brock, Esquire, Secretary Virginia Historical Society, 1882

References

History of British India, James Mill, vol 1, 1826

History of Mumbai
1640s births
1714 deaths
British East India Company Marine personnel